Lorena da Silva Leite (born 6 May 1997), simply known as Lorena, is a Brazilian professional footballer who plays as a goalkeeper for Grêmio.

Club career
Born in Ituverava, São Paulo, Lorena played for the youth sides of Bangu, Centro Olímpico and Grêmio, being a third-choice goalkeeper for Centro Olímpico in 2016. For the 2017 season, she joined Sport Recife, where she became a regular starter.

In 2019, Lorena returned to Grêmio, being initially a backup to Raissa but taking over the starting spot in the 2021 season.

International career
After representing Brazil at under-20 level, Lorena received her first call up for the full side on 31 August 2021. She made her international debut on 29 November of that year, starting in a 4–1 International Women's Football Tournament of Manaus win over Venezuela.

Career statistics

International

References

1997 births
Living people
Sportspeople from São Paulo (state)
Brazilian women's footballers
Women's association football goalkeepers
Campeonato Brasileiro de Futebol Feminino Série A1 players
Brazil women's international footballers
Grêmio Foot-Ball Porto Alegrense (women) players
People from Ituverava